Hayston is an unincorporated community in Newton County, in the U.S. state of Georgia.

History
A post office was established at Hayston in 1893, and remained in operation until 1957. The community was named after its resident postmaster, Alexander S. Hays.

References

Unincorporated communities in Newton County, Georgia